Wabe-Schunter-Beberbach is a Stadtbezirk (borough) in the north-eastern and eastern part of Braunschweig, Germany. The district is named after the river Schunter and its tributaries Wabe and Beberbach.

The Stadtbezirk comprises the quarters Bevenrode, Bienrode, Gliesmarode, Riddagshausen, Querum, and Waggum.

History

The district was formed in 2011 out of the former districts of Wabe-Schunter and Bienrode-Waggum-Bevenrode. Both districts consisted of villages that were incorporated into Braunschweig during the 20th century, in 1934 (Gliesmarode, Querum, and Riddagshausen) and in 1974 (Bevenrode, Bienrode, and Waggum).

Main sights
 Riddagshausen Abbey (German: Kloster Riddagshausen), a former Cistercian monastery, with the surrounding nature reserve and arboretum, as well as the village of Riddagshausen with several old farm houses. The nature reserve Riddagshäuser Teiche is designated as Important Bird Area and Special Protection Area.
 The inn Grüner Jäger ("Green Huntsman") in Riddagshausen, built in the mid-18th century.
 The 12th century Church of the Holy Trinity (German: Zur Heiligen Dreifaltigkeit) in Bienrode.
 The 12th century Church St. Peter and Paul in Bevenrode.
 The Gliesmaroder Turm, formerly a tower in the medieval fortifications of Braunschweig which was torn down in the 18th century and replaced with an inn of the same name which still stands.

Politics

The district mayor Gerhard Stülten is a member of the Social Democratic Party of Germany.

Transport

Train

Braunschweig-Gliesmarode station is located on the Brunswick–Uelzen railway line, which connects the district with Braunschweig Central Station and several towns in the Lüneburg Heath.

Air

Coats of arms

References

Wabe-Schunter-Beberbach